Royal tours of Canada in the 21st century carry on the tradition of the previous 300 years, either as an official tour, a working tour, a vacation, or a period of military service by a member of the Royal Family. Originally, royal tours of Canada were events predominantly for Canadians to see and possibly meet members of their royal family, with the associated patriotic pomp and spectacle. However, nearing the end of the 20th century, such occasions took on the added dimension of a theme; for instance, the 2005 tour of Saskatchewan and Alberta by Queen Elizabeth II and Prince Philip, Duke of Edinburgh, was deemed to be a vehicle for Her Majesty and all other Canadians to honour "The Spirit of Nation Builders". Also, junior members of the Royal Family began to undertake unofficial "working" tours of Canada as well; in this method, royal figures are invited by provinces, municipalities, and other organizations to events which the latter fund without assistance from the federal government. Charles III; Anne, Princess Royal; Andrew, Duke of York; and Prince Edward, Earl of Wessex, have all made several small tours in this fashion.

Canadian Royal Family

2000–2009

2010–2019

2020–

See also
Royal tours of Canada
List of royal tours of Canada (18th-20th centuries)
List of state and official visits by Canada

References

Monarchy in Canada
Lists of 21st-century trips
21st century in Canada
2000
Tours of Canada 2000
Canada history-related lists